General elections were held in Liberia on 4 May 1943 alongside a constitutional referendum. William Tubman of the True Whig Party was elected unopposed. He took office on 3 January 1944.

References

Liberia
1943 in Liberia
Elections in Liberia
Single-candidate elections
May 1943 events
Election and referendum articles with incomplete results